Greer is an unincorporated community in Clearwater County, Idaho, on the Nez Perce Indian Reservation.

History

Greer's population was 70 in 1960.

References

Unincorporated communities in Clearwater County, Idaho
Unincorporated communities in Idaho